Terra Boa (Portuguese for "good land") may refer to the following places:

 Terra Boa, Paraná, Brazil
 Terra Boa, Cape Verde